Tiarella nautila is a species of flowering plant in the family Saxifragaceae. The specific name nautila alludes to its sail-like stem leaves. Accordingly, it is sometimes called the sail-leaf foamflower. The species is narrowly endemic to the Blue Ridge Mountains in the southeastern United States.

Description
Tiarella nautila is a perennial, herbaceous plant with a short, slender rhizome. It has a leafy flowering stem and relatively large basal leaves with an extended terminal lobe. Most importantly, the species lacks the ability to produce stolons.

Identification
To positively identify Tiarella nautila, all of the following key features must be verified (in any order):

 Stolon always absent
 Basal leaves usually longer than wide
 Basal leaf lobes usually acute-acuminate with the terminal lobe prominently extended
 Flowering stem usually with leaves or foliaceous bracts

If the plant in question has a stolon, it is not Tiarella nautila. In that case, it is either Tiarella stolonifera or Tiarella austrina.

Except for the flowering stem, the key features listed above are identical to those of Tiarella wherryi, so distinguishing the two species may be difficult. Likewise, except for the stolon, Tiarella nautila has features similar to Tiarella austrina, so expect difficulties there as well.

Sometimes Tiarella nautila has a branched flowering stem. Since no other species of Tiarella has that feature, a branched flowering stem is sufficient to identify Tiarella nautila.

Taxonomy
Tiarella nautila was described by Guy Nesom in 2021. Its type specimen was collected by Arthur Cronquist in Union County, Georgia in 1947.

Distribution
Tiarella nautila is narrowly endemic to the southeastern United States where it occurs mainly in the southern Blue Ridge Mountains of northern Georgia and adjacent North Carolina and Tennessee. Counties where the species is known to occur include:

 Georgia: Bartow, Cherokee, Cobb, Dawson, DeKalb, Fannin, Floyd, Forsyth, Gilmer, Hall, Jackson, Lumpkin, Murray, Pickens, Towns, Union, White
 North Carolina: Cherokee
 Tennessee: Monroe, Polk

The ranges of Tiarella nautila and Tiarella austrina overlap in Georgia (Dawson, Towns, White), North Carolina (Cherokee), and Tennessee (Monroe). The ranges of Tiarella nautila and Tiarella wherryi overlap in Georgia (Bartow, Floyd) and Tennessee (Monroe, Polk). The ranges of Tiarella nautila and Tiarella cordifolia overlap in Jackson County, Georgia.

Conservation
The global conservation status of Tiarella nautila is unknown. In North Carolina, it is imperiled at best (S1S2).

References

Bibliography
 
 

nautila
Flora of the United States
Flora of the Southeastern United States
Flora of the Appalachian Mountains
Plants described in 2021
Taxa named by Guy L. Nesom
Flora without expected TNC conservation status